The Crasna (Romanian) or Kraszna (Hungarian) is the name of a river in northwestern Romania and northeastern Hungary. The Crasna is a left tributary of the Tisza. Its source is in Transylvania, Romania, near the village of Crasna. It flows through the Romanian counties Sălaj and Satu Mare and the Hungarian county Szabolcs-Szatmár-Bereg. It flows into the Tisza in Vásárosnamény. Cities along the Crasna are Șimleu Silvaniei in Romania, Nagyecsed and Mátészalka in Hungary.

Until the 1890s the Crasna discharged into the river Someș. Since then, the lower course of the Crasna has been regulated and it discharges into the Tisza 3.5 km downstream of the confluence of Tisza and Someș.

Towns and villages

The following towns and villages are situated along the river Crasna, from source to mouth: Horoatu Crasnei, Crasna, Vârșolț, Pericei, Șimleu Silvaniei, Măeriște, Sărmășag, Bobota, Supur, Acâș, Craidorolț, Moftin, Berveni (in Romania) and Nagyecsed, Mátészalka and Vásárosnamény (in Hungary).

Tributaries

The following rivers are tributaries to the Crasna:
Left: Ban, Marin, Mortăuța, Carastelec, Zănicel, Valea Neagră, Horea
Right: Valea Boului, Pria, Ponița, Colițca, Zalău, Maja, Cerna, Maria, Tăul Terebești

References

External links 
 

Rivers of Romania
Rivers of Sălaj County
Rivers of Satu Mare County
Rivers of Hungary
International rivers of Europe